Dolceacqua (locally ) is a comune (municipality) in the Province of Imperia in the Italian region Liguria, located about  southwest of Genoa and about  west of Imperia, on the border with France.

Dolceacqua borders the following municipalities: Airole, Apricale, Breil-sur-Roya (France), Camporosso, Isolabona, Perinaldo, Rocchetta Nervina, San Biagio della Cima, and Ventimiglia.

In Dolceacqua is located the Pinacoteca Giovanni Morscio.

Demographic evolution

References

External links
 www.dolceacqua.it

Hilltowns in Liguria
Cities and towns in Liguria